Peter Isaac Thellusson, 1st Baron Rendlesham (13 October 1761 – 16 September 1808), was a British merchant, banker and politician.

Thelluson was the eldest son of Peter Thellusson, a wealthy London merchant who had emigrated to Britain from France in 1760, and his wife Ann, daughter of Matthew Woodford. After Thellusson senior's death his considerable estate was embroiled in the Thellusson will case.

Peter Isaac was educated at Harrow School and took over the thriving family business from his father. Like his father he also became a director of the Bank of England (1787–1806).

He sat as Member of Parliament for Midhurst from 1795 to 1796, for Malmesbury from 1796 to 1802, for Castle Rising from 1802 to 1806 and for Bossiney from 1807 to 1808. In 1806 he was raised to the Peerage of Ireland as Baron Rendlesham, of Rendlesham in Suffolk.

Lord Rendlesham, who lived at Rendlesham Hall, died in September 1808, aged only 46. He had married Elizabeth Eleanor, the daughter of John Cornwall, a Russia merchant of Hendon, Middlesex, and was succeeded in the barony by his eldest son John.

References

 
Kidd, Charles, Williamson, David (editors). Debrett's Peerage and Baronetage (1990 edition). New York: St Martin's Press, 1990,

External links 
 

1761 births
1808 deaths
People educated at Harrow School
British bankers
Barons in the Peerage of Ireland
Peers of Ireland created by George III
Members of the Parliament of Great Britain for English constituencies
British MPs 1790–1796
British MPs 1796–1800
Thelluson, Peter, 1st Baron Rendle
Members of the Parliament of the United Kingdom for English constituencies
UK MPs 1801–1802
UK MPs 1802–1806
UK MPs 1807–1812
UK MPs who were granted peerages